is a Japanese singer, voice actor, and actor. His birth name is Hiroshi Watanabe. His wife is voice actress . In the past, Watari was signed to 81 Produce, Stunt Japan (スタントジャパン) and Ayers Rock; he is currently signed with Rough. He is best known for his roles of Den Iga in the 1983 Metal Heroes Series Space Sheriff Sharivan and Yousuke Jou in Jikuu Senshi Spielban, making him the only actor to play two different Heroes in two Metal Hero Series.

Early life 
Watari graduated from Niigata Prefectural Niigata Koyo High School (新潟県立新潟向陽高等学校). He was inspired by Shin'ichi Chiba  in Key Hunter and joined JAC (Japan Action Club), now Japan Action Enterprise (ジャパンアクションエンタープライズ), in March 1981. At first, he used Hiroshi Watanabe as his stage name, gaining experience by taking minor roles.

In 1983, Watari was selected to play the protagonist Den Iga in Space Sheriff Sharivan and took on Hiroshi Watari as his stage name. In 1986, he played the title role in Jikuu Senshi Spielban.

In 1988, he quit JAC and moved to acting on the stage. In 1990, he played Shinkansen Hashimoto in Starlight Express. In 1992, he portrayed G1 in Miss Saigon.

Watari is also a voice actor.

In 2014, Watari played the role of Den Iga in Space Sheriff NEXT GENERATION.

In 2015, he started his own talk show on Niconico Channel, .

Filmography (actor)

TV series

The Television Program

Film 
 Zebraman (2004)

Video

Filmography (voice)

Anime 
 Kaikan Phrase
 Daa! Daa! Daa!
 DNAngel - Adonis
 Detective Conan - Koji Misawa

Video Game 
 Space Sheriff Spirits - Den Iga/Sharivan

Music Video 
 Ricardo Cruz - "On The Rocks"

References 
 ^ "Japan Talent Directory '92" VIP Times, Inc., 1992, 336 pages.
 ^ "Hiroshi Watari INTERVIEW", "Toei Hero MAX" Vol.1, Tatsumi Publishing, 2002, 96 - 97 pages, .
 ^ Than "space-time police Wecker Signa" DVD, Volume 6 extras.
 ^ Than "space-time police Wecker Signa" DVD, Volume 6 audio commentary.

External links 
  Watari Hiroshi World
  Hiroshi Watari Site Ayers Rock
 

1963 births
Japanese male television actors
Japanese male singers
Japanese male voice actors
Male voice actors from Niigata Prefecture
Actors from Niigata Prefecture
Living people
Musicians from Niigata Prefecture
81 Produce voice actors